Brent E. Dickson (born July 18, 1941) is an American attorney and jurist who served as a justice of the Indiana Supreme Court from January 6, 1986 to April 29, 2016, and was chief justice of the Court from 2012 to 2014. He retired from the Indiana Supreme Court on April 29, 2016.

Early life and education 
Born in Hobart, Indiana, Dickson earned a Bachelor of Science degree from Purdue University in 1964 and a Juris Doctor from the Indiana University Robert H. McKinney School of Law in 1968. During law school, Dickson attended evening courses while working full-time as an insurance claims adjuster.

Career 
He practiced law in Lafayette from 1968 to 1985 and became the senior partner in the law firm of Dickson, Reiling, Teder & Withered. He was appointed by Governor Robert D. Orr to replace retiring Indiana Supreme Court Justice Dixon Prentice. The appointment began January 6, 1986, and he was retained by election in 1988.

See also

List of justices of the Indiana Supreme Court

References

1941 births
Living people
Chief Justices of the Indiana Supreme Court
Indiana lawyers
Justices of the Indiana Supreme Court
Indiana University Robert H. McKinney School of Law alumni
People from Gary, Indiana